The 11th Grand Prix de La Baule was a Formula Two motor race held on 24 August 1952 in La Baule-Escoublac, France. It was round 8, and the final round, of Les Grands Prix de France Championship. Race distance was determined by time rather than the number of laps, the result being declared after 3 hours. The race was won from pole position by Alberto Ascari in a Ferrari 500. Ascari's teammate Luigi Villoresi finished second and set fastest lap, and Louis Rosier in his privateer 500 was third.

Background

Race history
The Grand Prix of La Baule was a Grand Prix event organized 10 times in La Baule-Escoublac between 1924 and 1952. William Grover-Williams won the event three consecutive years, from 1931 to 1933. Originally raced on the famed beach at La Baule, the 1952 event was moved near the aerodrome of the French coastal town.

Classification

Qualifying classification

Race

References

Baule Grand Prix
Baule Grand Prix
Baule Grand Prix